Aurore Kassambara (born 26 October 1979) is a French athlete who specialises in  the hurdles. Kassambara competed at the 2009 World Championships in Athletics in Berlin.

She became Champion of France for the 400m hurdles in 2008 running 55.96s just missing the minimum Olympic qualifying time by a little. She beat this time at the meeting Herculis at Monaco running 55.24s. She was selected for the 2008 Olympic Games at Peking for the female  4 × 400 m relay but did not actually run in the event.

References

External links
 
 

1979 births
Living people
French female hurdlers
Universiade medalists in athletics (track and field)
Athletes from Paris
Mediterranean Games silver medalists for France
Mediterranean Games medalists in athletics
Athletes (track and field) at the 2009 Mediterranean Games
Universiade silver medalists for France
Medalists at the 2003 Summer Universiade
Medalists at the 2005 Summer Universiade